2021 Karachi explosion may refer to:

2021 Karachi grenade attack, in August
December 2021 Karachi explosion